Welcome Plastics is the debut studio album by Japanese rock band Plastics, released in 1980 by the Victor Music Industries label Invitation.

Reception 

Trouser Press called the album "marvelous and well worth finding for fans of extreme kitsch and quirk".

Legacy 
Welcome Plastics was ranked number 19 in the Japanese edition Rolling Stone's list of "The 100 Greatest Japanese Rock Albums of All Time".

Track listing

Release history

The entire album is included on the Forever Plastico compilation album.
"Copy", "Robot", "Delicious", "Digital Watch", "Complex", "Last Train to Clarksville", "Can I Help Me?", "I Love You Oh No!" and "Welcome Plastics" are included on the Origato 25 compilation album.
"Top Secret Man", "Copy" and "Delicious" are included (as part of music videos) on the Deluxe Edition 2016 reissue of Origato Plastico.

References

External links 
 

1979 debut albums